The 2012 South American Rugby Championship "A" was the 34th edition of the competition of the leading national Rugby Union teams in South America.

The tournament was held in Santiago, Chile. The last place team in the tournament, Brazil, will face the winner of a playoff between the winners of the 2012 South American Rugby Championship "B" division and the 2012 NACRA Caribbean tournament for a place in the 2013 tournament (which will serve a role in qualification for the 2015 Rugby World Cup).

Standings
{| class="wikitable"
|-
!width=165|Team
!width=40|Played
!width=40|Won
!width=40|Drawn
!width=40|Lost
!width=40|For
!width=40|Against
!width=40|Difference
!width=40|Pts
|- align=center
|align=left| 
|3||3||0||0||210||11||+199||9
|- align=center
|align=left| 
|3||2||0||1||59||81||−22||6
|- align=center
|align=left| 
|3||1||0||2||51||92||-31||3
|- align=center
|align=left| 
|3||0||0||3||21||157||−136||0
|}

Matches

Related Page 
 2012 South American Rugby Championship "B"
 2012 South American Rugby Championship "C"

References

 IRB – South American Championship 2012

External links 
 Details

Notes 

2012
2012 rugby union tournaments for national teams
A
South American Rugby Championship "A"
rugby union
rugby union
rugby union
International rugby union competitions hosted by Chile
Rugby Championship "A"